Celeste Martins Caeiro (born 2 May 1933), also known as Celeste dos cravos ("Celeste of the carnations") is a Portuguese pacifist and former restaurant worker. Her actions led to the naming of the 1974 coup as the Carnation Revolution.

Life

Caeiro was born in 1933. She came to prominence during the revolution to overthrow Marcelo Caetano. She gave out red and white carnations to the soldiers, leading to the action of 25 April 1974 being known as the "Carnation Revolution". She was working in a self-service restaurant in Lisbon called "Sir" located at Franjinhas Building on Rua Braamcamp. The restaurant was opened on 25 April 1973 and for its first anniversary the owners planned to give out flowers to all its customers on 25 April 1974 but this had to be cancelled because of the coup. She was sent home and told that she could take the wasted red and white flowers.

She offered the flowers to the tanks involved with the coup and they placed the flowers in the muzzle of their guns. The idea was copied and flower sellers donated more flowers to decorate the mutinous soldiers and their weapons.

The anniversary of the Carnation Revolution is a national holiday in Portugal.

References

1933 births
Living people
Carnation Revolution
Portuguese pacifists
Place of birth missing (living people)